Springfield Friends Meetinghouse is a Quaker meeting house at 1001 Old Sproul Road in Springfield Township, Delaware County, Pennsylvania, United States.  The Quakers who settled in Springfield founded a society of Friends in 1686.  The first meetinghouse built in Springfield was in 1703 and was destroyed by fire in 1737.   The building was rumored to be made of stone but was more likely a log building.  The construction of a new meetinghouse began in 1738 and was a stone building and functioned as the meetinghouse for 113 years until replaced by the current structure in 1850.

The Springfield Friends meetinghouse is still an active worship center.  The Peace Center of Delaware County also operates out of the meetinghouse.

Notable burials
 Edward Mifflin (1923–1971), Pennsylvania State Representative

References

External links
 

1850 establishments in Pennsylvania
19th-century Quaker meeting houses
Cemeteries in Delaware County, Pennsylvania
Churches completed in 1850
Churches in Delaware County, Pennsylvania
Springfield Township, Delaware County, Pennsylvania
Quaker meeting houses in Pennsylvania